Sorbus aria (syn. Aria nivea), the whitebeam or common whitebeam, is a deciduous tree, the type species of the subgenus Sorbus subg. Aria of the genus Sorbus. It is native to most of Europe as well as North Africa (Algeria, Morocco, Tunisia) and temperate Asia (Armenia, Georgia). Typically compact and domed, with few upswept branches and almost-white underside of the leaves, it generally favours dry limestone and chalk soils. The hermaphrodite cream-white flowers appear in May, are insect pollinated, and go on to produce scarlet berries, which are often eaten by birds.

The cultivars S. aria 'Lutescens', with very whitish-green early leaves, and S. aria 'Majestica', with large leaves, have both have gained the Royal Horticultural Society's Award of Garden Merit.

The berries are edible when overripe (bletted).

References

aria
Flora of Europe